Moses B. Walker (July 16, 1819 – December 17, 1895) was a Union Army officer during the American Civil War

Born in Fairfield County, Ohio, July 16, 1819, Walker attended Augusta College in Kentucky and Yale College and Cincinnati Law School. He served one term in the Ohio Senate from 1850 until 1851. He was a lawyer and judge.

Walker was a captain of the 12th U.S. Infantry Regiment, August 23, 1861. He was appointed colonel of the 31st Ohio Infantry Regiment, September 23, 1861. He had several temporary brigade commands in the Army of the Ohio and Army of the Cumberland. He was wounded at the Battle of Chickamauga, September 23, 1863. Walker was mustered out of the volunteers on July 20, 1865 and retired from the Regular Army (United States), February 19, 1866. He was promoted to colonel on the regular army retired list on July 28, 1866.

On January 13, 1866, President Andrew Johnson nominated Walker for appointment to the grade of brevet brigadier general of volunteers, to rank from March 27, 1865, and the United States Senate confirmed the appointment on March 12, 1866.

In 1868, after losing an election to the U.S. House of Representatives, he began participating in the military occupation of Texas.  Walker served as associate justice of the Texas Supreme Court from 1869 until 1874.

Walker died in Kenton, Ohio, December 17, 1895. He was buried in Grove Cemetery, Kenton, Ohio.

References

See also 

List of American Civil War brevet generals (Union)

Union Army colonels
United States Army colonels
Ohio state senators
Justices of the Texas Supreme Court
People of Ohio in the American Civil War
1819 births
1895 deaths
Augusta College (Kentucky) alumni
Yale College alumni
19th-century American politicians
19th-century American judges